Cyrill Gasser (born 11 March 1992) is a Swiss footballer who plays as midfielder. He used to play for FC Schötz in the Swiss 1. Liga.

Career
In the 2010/11 season, Gasser played for SC Buochs.

Ahead of the 2019/20 season, Gasser joined FC Schötz from SC Cham.

References

External links
 
 

1992 births
Living people
Swiss men's footballers
SC Cham players
FC Thun players
Swiss Super League players
Swiss Promotion League players
Association football midfielders